Omarr Morgan (born December 4, 1976 in Hollywood, California) is a Canadian Football League cornerback who is currently a free agent.

In college, Morgan played for Brigham Young University. He was signed as a free agent by Saskatchewan in 1999, but didn't make the team until 2000 when the Roy Shivers regime took over the Roughriders franchise.  Since that time, he had been a mainstay in the Riders' defensive secondary playing the weak-side corner position.  He was named to the CFL All-Star team in 2002, 2003, and 2005.  He attended the St. Louis Rams' (National Football League) training camp in 1998. He was the only player in the 1998 Senior Bowl not drafted into the NFL.

In February 2007, he was signed by the Eskimos. He was signed by Saskatchewan again in 2008 as a free agent.

On February 28, 2011, Morgan was released by the Saskatchewan Roughriders.

References

1976 births
Living people
American players of Canadian football
BYU Cougars football players
Canadian football defensive backs
Edmonton Elks players
People from Hollywood, Los Angeles
Players of Canadian football from Los Angeles
Saskatchewan Roughriders players